Narcisse Bonan (born August 3, 1984) is an Ivorian former professional footballer who played as a striker .

External links
 
 

1984 births
Living people
People from Yamoussoukro
Ivorian footballers
Association football forwards
Ligue 2 players
Championnat National players
Championnat National 2 players
US Boulogne players
UJA Maccabi Paris Métropole players
Ivorian expatriate footballers
Ivorian expatriate sportspeople in France
Expatriate footballers in France